Ditlef Eckhoff (born 21 June 1942 in Stokke, Norway) is a Norwegian jazz musician (trumpet) known from numerous recordings and central on the Oslo Jazz Scene.

Career 
Eckhoff was active early in his hometown where he led his own ensembles, won the Norwegian championship in jazz (1958), started Tønsberg jazz club (1958) and was the first head of the Tønsberg Society of Jazz & Poetry (1967). He resided in Oslo since 1959, and here he played with Einar Iversen (1959), Kristian Bergheim (1959), Arild Wikstrøm, Egil Kapstad and Egil Johansen. He studied education theory and trumpet at the Norwegian Academy of Music (1969–74) and participated in the University Big Band in Oslo (Chair 1974–1976). Eckhoff collaborated with international jazz greats such as Phil Woods/George Russell (1967), Dizzy Gillespie at Kongsberg Jazzfestival (1971), Red Mitchell/Kenny Drew at NRK Radio (1973), Dexter Gordon at Vossajazz (1975), and Horace Parlan (1980/83).
Later he has led his own quintet and moved to Nice in France. He led the Ditlef Eckhoff Quintet at Herr Nilsen Jazz Club in Oslo 2012.

Discography

Solo albums 
1980: Live at Jazz Alive, with Knut Riisnæs (saxophone), Ole Jacob Hansen (drums), Eivin Sannes (piano) & Kaj Hartvigsen (bass)
1997: Impressions of Antibes (Gemini Records), with Eric Reed live from scenes like Cosmopolite in Oslo
1998: Pastor'n & Diffen (Hi-Di), with Einar Iversen (piano), Odd André Elveland (saxophone), Mats Eilertsen (bass) & Ole Jacob Hansen (drums)
1999: Merry Christmas, with Jan Erik Kongshaug (guitar) & Sture Janson/Harald Johnsen bass (istedenfor Elveland og Eilertsen)
2007: Jazz au bord de mer, with Jan Berger (guitar) & Eddy Gaulein-Stef (bass)

Collaborations 
With Terje Rypdal
1968: Bleak House (Polydor/Universal, Norway)

With other projects
2003: Bjørn Johansen in memoriam

References

External links 
Eckhoff, Ditlef Biografphy at Norsk Musikkinformasjon

1942 births
Living people
Musicians from Stokke
Norwegian jazz composers
Norwegian jazz trumpeters
Male trumpeters
20th-century Norwegian trumpeters
21st-century Norwegian trumpeters
Gemini Records artists
Male jazz composers
20th-century Norwegian male musicians
21st-century Norwegian male musicians